Isaiah C. Inman (July 23, 1830 – May 6, 1889) was sheriff of Barnstable County, Massachusetts in the late 1800s.  He previously served as a deputy sheriff and was a justice of the peace.  Inman Road Beach in Dennis, Massachusetts is named for his family.  He was buried in Swan Pond Cemetery in Dennis Port.

References

Massachusetts sheriffs
1830 births
1889 deaths